Antonin Svoboda or Antonín Svoboda may refer to:

 Antonín Svoboda (athlete) (1900–1965), Czech Olympics sprinter
 Antonín Svoboda (computer scientist) (1907–1980), Czech computer scientist
 Antonín Svoboda (footballer) (born 2002), Czech football player
  (born 1969), Austrian film director and producer

See also 
 Svoboda (surname)
 Antonin (name)